Anne-France Brunet (born 12 June 1962) is a French politician of Renaissance served as a member of the French National Assembly from 2017 to 2022, representing the department of Loire-Atlantique.

Political career
Brune joined LREM in 2016.

In parliament, Brunet served on the Defence Committee from 2017 until 2018 before moving to the Committee on Economic Affairs. In addition to her committee assignments, she is also a member of the French-German Parliamentary Friendship Group.

In September 2018, after François de Rugy's appointment to the government, Brunet supported Barbara Pompili's candidacy for the presidency of the National Assembly.

Political positions
In July 2019, Brunet voted in favor of the French ratification of the European Union’s Comprehensive Economic and Trade Agreement (CETA) with Canada.

Controversy
In 2022, a former parliamentary assistant filed a complaint against Bunet, alleging "incessant" phone calls on her personal phone, unpaid work days and "humiliations in public" during the time of employment in 2018.

References

1962 births
Living people
People from Saint-Maur-des-Fossés
Women members of the National Assembly (France)
La République En Marche! politicians
21st-century French women politicians
Deputies of the 15th National Assembly of the French Fifth Republic

Members of Parliament for Loire-Atlantique